Pacific Heights is geographically located in north west Saskatoon. The main construction boom for this community was the 1970s, during which the City of Saskatoon annexed the land. Following elementary school, students usually attend Tommy Douglas Collegiate or Bethlehem Catholic High School on Bowlt Crescent a part of Blairmore SDA community. According to MLS data, the average sale price of a home as of 2013 was $279,500.

Layout
Diefenbaker Drive is a main artery which curves around the neighbourhood on both the eastern and the northern limits. Childers Crescent defines the western edge, and the main City thoroughfare of 22nd Street West is the southern perimeter.

Abolishment of Monck Avenue 
The 2012 concept plan for the new community of Kensington, to the west, indicated the neighborhood's westernmost street, Monck Avenue would be abolished, despite having been constructed in the 1970s. The street never had any residential development, due to its status of bordering along the R.M. of Corman Park on the west side.

The City of Saskatoon officially announced the closure in the summer of 2013, following the successful annexation from the R.M. of Corman Park that saw the land from Monck Avenue to Neault Road become part of the city limits.

Due to its lack of residential development and status of being located between Diefenbaker and Centennial Drives on the city limits, Monck Avenue earned a notoriety for speeding and late night drag racing in the 2000s prior to the installation of speed bumps in 2007.

Monck Avenue was replaced by both Childers Crescent on the south end and Diefenbaker Terrace on the north end, when the first phase of Kensington was developed in 2013, with the Devonshire Crescent leg closed off and rerouted to a back lane leading to Diefenbaker Drive, as a way to compensate for the loss of Monck.

To date, it is unknown whether or not the City of Saskatoon plans to reuse the Monck name on any future street developments.

Area Parks
 Pacific Park 
 Pacific Park  
 Atlantic Park

Government and politics
Pacific Heights exists within the federal electoral district of Saskatoon West. It is currently represented by Brad Redekopp of the Conservative Party of Canada, first elected in 2015.

Provincially, the area is within the constituency of Saskatoon Fairview. It is currently represented by Vicki Mowat of the Saskatchewan New Democratic Party, first elected in a 2017 by-election.

In Saskatoon's non-partisan municipal politics, Pacific Heights lies within ward 3. It is currently represented by Ann Iwanchuk, first elected in 2011.

Education

 Lester B. Pearson Public Elementary School
 Father Vachon Separate Elementary School
Both Lester B. Pearson School and Father Vachon School are nestled side by each along Centennial Drive with their northern school yards extend out into Pacific Park.

Shopping

Pacific Heights is served by the amenities provided next door at Confederation Suburban Centre especially 22nd Street Arterial Commercial District which is just across Diefenbaker Drive.  Community residents will also soon enjoy those proffered by  Blairmore Suburban Centre  which is under construction.

Transportation 
Highway 14 extends out westward from 22nd Street West and is being revamped for the new neighbourhood construction west of the old City limits.  Blairmore SDA will soon define the new western city limits.  Asquith and, Biggar will soon be the new bedroom communities as Saskatoon expands.

City Transit
Pacific Heights is serviced by the City Transit Bus Route Saskatoon Transit. Route 60: Confederation & Route 65: Kensington.

Life
Pacific Heights community Association, established November 1978, puts on elementary school fun nights, and is responsible for assembling together a number of sports, recreational and fitness programs for the areas various age groups.  The association also maintains their own website at Pacific Heights Community Association

History
The roadways are mainly named after prominent politicians and fathers of confederation.

References

External links

 Local Area Planning
 Saskatoon Neighbourhoods Word Search Puzzle
 City of Saskatoon City of Saskatoon · Departments · Community Services · City Planning · ZAM Maps
 Populace Spring 2006

Neighbourhoods in Saskatoon